Oldenburg Air Base is a former German Air Force air base within Lower Saxony, Germany. During the Cold War it was used by the British Royal Air Force (RAF) as part of Royal Air Force Germany until 1957.

Royal Air Force history

The following units were here at some point:
 No. 14 Squadron RAF between 23 June 1955 and 26 September 1959 when the squadron moved to RAF Ahlhorn. Operated Hawker Hunter F.4 & F.6's
 No. 20 Squadron RAF from 28 July 1952 until 23 September 1957. The squadron operated a variety of aircraft including de Havilland Vampire FB.5 & FB.9s, Canadair Sabre F.4s & Hawker Hunter F.4 & F.6s
 No. 26 Squadron RAF from 12 August 1952 until 10 September 1957 when the squadron disbanded. The unit operated Sabre F.4s and Hunter F.4s
 No. 234 Squadron RAF reformed here  on 1 August 1952 staying until 8 January 1954 when the squadron moved to RAF Geilenkirchen. The unit operated Vampire FB.5 & FB.9s and Sabre F.4s

References

Citations

Bibliography

Bases of the German Air Force
Airports in Lower Saxony
Defunct airports in Germany